Wear is a scientific journal publishing papers on wear and friction. The papers may fall within the subjects of physics, chemistry, material science or mechanical engineering. It is published by Elsevier.

See also
 List of periodicals published by Elsevier

External links
 Wear homepage

Elsevier academic journals
Physics journals